Guy Newman (born 26 November 1957) is a retired English-American soccer defender who played in the North American Soccer League, American Soccer League and Major Indoor Soccer League.  He is currently coaching at East County Surf Soccer Club.

Player
The son of English player and coach, Ron Newman, Guy grew up in the United States. In 1977, he played for the semi professional Maccabi Los Angeles club when it won the National Challenge Cup.  He turned professional in 1978 with the Tampa Bay Rowdies of the North American Soccer League, but injured his shoulder less than 30 seconds into an indoor friendly vs Norwich City F.C.  He was never able to break into the first team outdoors and moved on to the Fort Lauderdale Strikers in 1979.  In 1980, he followed his father to the expansion Miami Americans of the American Soccer League.  The team lasted only one season before folding.  When Ron Newman moved to coach the San Diego Sockers in 1980, he brought in Guy.  In 1982, Guy took the field with the Sockers and played three outdoor seasons with them.  He also played forty-five regular season games for the Sockers indoor team which played in both the NASL indoor circuit as well as in the Major Indoor Soccer League.  Newman retired from playing professionally in 1987.

Coach
After retiring as a player, Newman assisted his father at the Sockers from 1987 to 1993.  In March 1994, he was hired as the head coach of the Las Vegas Dustdevils which won the 1994 Continental Indoor Soccer League championship.  The Dustdevils folded at the end of the 1995 season.  In 1996, Newman became an assistant to his father at the Kansas City Wizards of Major League Soccer.  In 2000, he became the head coach of the Del Mar Sharks and in 2009 became Director of Coaching Encinitas Express.

References

External links
NASL/MISL stats

1957 births
Living people
American soccer coaches
American soccer players
American Soccer League (1933–1983) players
Continental Indoor Soccer League coaches
Major Indoor Soccer League (1978–1992) coaches
Major Indoor Soccer League (1978–1992) players
Miami Americans players
North American Soccer League (1968–1984) indoor players
North American Soccer League (1968–1984) players
Fort Lauderdale Strikers (1977–1983) players
San Diego Sockers (original MISL) players
San Diego Sockers (NASL) players
Tampa Bay Rowdies (1975–1993) players
Footballers from Portsmouth
Association football defenders